Old Market Building, also known as The Rice Museum, is a historic public market building located at Georgetown, Georgetown County, South Carolina. It was built in 1832–1835, and is a one-story, Classical Revival temple-form building on a high arcaded base. 

The arched area was used as an open-air market but was enclosed in the early-20th century. A tower topped by a square stage and an open belfry was added. The tower houses a four-sided clock that was added in about 1842. The building has served as a town hall, a jail, an open-air market, and a slave market.

It was listed on the National Register of Historic Places in 1969.

References

External links

 Rice Museum and Clock Tower

Historic American Buildings Survey in South Carolina
Commercial buildings on the National Register of Historic Places in South Carolina
Commercial buildings completed in 1842
Neoclassical architecture in South Carolina
National Register of Historic Places in Georgetown County, South Carolina
Buildings and structures in Georgetown, South Carolina
1842 establishments in South Carolina